Eagle Lake is an endorheic lake in the western Chilcotin District of the Central Interior of British Columbia, Canada, located southeast of Tatla Lake and west of the city of Williams Lake. The lake is a popular summer location with warm water, sky-blue water, and white sand beaches. The lake has no outflow, and the water level continues to recede over time. Since 1970 the lake level has dropped over 6m (as of 2018). This means that the former Islands are now connected to the shoreline and new Islands have been created on the western bay.

References

Lakes of the Chilcotin
Lakes of British Columbia
Range 2 Coast Land District